Infer.NET is a free and open source .NET software library for machine learning. It supports running Bayesian inference in graphical models and can also be used for probabilistic programming.

Overview
Infer.NET follows a model-based approach and is used to solve different kinds of machine learning problems including standard problems like classification, recommendation or clustering, customized solutions and domain-specific problems. The framework is used in various different domains such as bioinformatics, epidemiology, computer vision, and information retrieval.

Development of the framework was started by a team at Microsoft’s research centre in Cambridge, UK in 2004. It was first released for academic use in 2008 and later open sourced in 2018. In 2013, Microsoft was awarded the USPTO’s Patents for Humanity Award in Information Technology category for Infer.NET and the work in advanced machine learning techniques.

Infer.NET is used internally at Microsoft as the machine learning engine in some of their products such as Office, Azure, and Xbox.

The source code is licensed under MIT License and available on GitHub. It is also available as NuGet package.

See also

 Machine learning
 ML.NET
 scikit-learn

References

Further reading

External links
 Infer.NET
 GitHub - dotnet/infer
 Machine Intelligence and Perception - Microsoft Research
 Infer.NET - Practical Implementation Issues and a Comparison of Approximation Techniques

Applied machine learning
Applications of artificial intelligence
Free and open-source software
Microsoft free software
Microsoft Research
Software that uses Mono (software)
Open-source artificial intelligence
Probabilistic models
Probabilistic software
Software using the MIT license
2008 software